This is a list of FIPS 10-4 region codes from P-R, using a standardized name format, and cross-linking to articles.

On September 2, 2008, FIPS 10-4 was one of ten standards withdrawn by NIST as a Federal Information Processing Standard. The list here is the last version of codes. For earlier versions, see link below.

PA: Paraguay

PE: Peru

PK: Pakistan

PL: Poland

PM: Panama

PO: Portugal

PP: Papua New Guinea

PS: Palau

PU: Guinea-Bissau

QA: Qatar

RO: Romania

RP: Philippines

RS: Russia

RW: Rwanda

See also
 List of FIPS region codes (A-C)
 List of FIPS region codes (D-F)
 List of FIPS region codes (G-I)
 List of FIPS region codes (J-L)
 List of FIPS region codes (M-O)
 List of FIPS region codes (S-U)
 List of FIPS region codes (V-Z)

Sources
 FIPS 10-4 Codes and history
 Last version of codes
 All codes (include earlier versions)
 Table to see the evolution of the codes over time
 Administrative Divisions of Countries ("Statoids"), Statoids.com

References

Region codes